"Bills, Bills, Bills" is a song by American group Destiny's Child from their second studio album, The Writing's on the Wall (1999). It was written by Beyoncé Knowles, LeToya Luckett, Kelly Rowland, Kandi Burruss of Xscape, and Kevin "She'kspere" Briggs and produced by the latter. The song was released as the lead single from The Writing's on the Wall on May 31, 1999, by Columbia Records. 

"Bills, Bills, Bills" became Destiny's Child's first number-one single on the US Billboard Hot 100. Internationally, it reached the top 10 in Belgium, Canada, Iceland, the Netherlands, and the United Kingdom. Critically acclaimed, the song was nominated for two Grammy Awards in 2000–Best R&B Performance by a Duo or Group with Vocals and Best R&B Song. 

The accompanying music video for "Bills, Bills, Bills", directed by Darren Grant, was filmed in a beauty salon as a tribute to Beyoncé's mother Tina Knowles. In 2021, the song resurged in popularity on streaming platforms, as well as TikTok, where it became the most popular "comeback" track in the United States and the United Kingdom that year.

Background and composition
"Bills, Bills, Bills" is one of the five tracks that Destiny's Child worked with Kandi Burruss and She'kspere on their sophomore album that would help create their signature sound. Burruss stated that the idea for the song came to them when they were in a store and Briggs began beat-boxing the beat in his head. Burruss also claimed that the lyrics, specifically the verses for the song, were inspired by personal dating experiences she had. The group members expanded on writing lyrics for the song after the concept was presented to them.

Musically, the song is a sassy, playful, and jittery R&B track with slinky instrumentation led by harpsichord-synthesizers. The track is described to have a quirky melody and descriptive lyrics that draw attention to listeners because of the story the group members are singing.

Release
In the United States, "Bills, Bills, Bills" was serviced to urban and rhythmic contemporary radio stations on May 31, 1999, and June 1, 1999, respectively. The single was then released physically in the United States on CD, maxi-CD, 12-inch vinyl, and cassette. In the United Kingdom, the song was issued on July 12, 1999, as a cassette and two maxi-CDs. Germany and France soon followed with maxi-CDs for the song being released on July 16, and July 26, respectively. The track was later sent to US contemporary hit radio on July 20, 1999.

Commercial performance
In the United States, "Bills, Bills, Bills" debuted at number 84 on the Billboard Hot 100 chart and climbed to number one five weeks later, dethroning Jennifer Lopez's debut single "If You Had My Love" from the top spot. It was Destiny's Child's first song to peak at number one on the Billboard Hot 100 and was the ninth-best-selling single of 1999 in the United States. "Bills, Bills, Bills" also reached number one on the Hot R&B/Hip-Hop Songs for nine consecutive weeks. In the United Kingdom, "Bills, Bills, Bills" peaked at number six on the UK Singles Chart.

Music video
The video takes place in a hair salon, inspired by Tina Knowles, Beyoncé's mother and the group's fashion stylist at the time. The video starts with Beyoncé arguing with her boyfriend and being fed up with him asking for her car keys. Destiny's Child are seen doing hair styling on clients. The members then do some choreography with salon chairs in light pink ensembles. In another setting, Destiny's Child are wearing black and white, zebra-like patterned outfits while so-called "broke", "tired", and "good for nothin'" men are seen in rooms behind them. The final setting for the video takes place in front a wall of glass block windows. Here, the members are wearing shiny blue outfits. The video is edited when the members are singing to the camera to make them move jittery to the beat. 

The video made its premiere on music video stations such as BET, MTV, and The Box on the week ending June 13, 1999.

Track listings

US CD and cassette single
 "Bills, Bills, Bills" (album version) – 4:16
 "Bug a Boo" (snippet) – 1:18
 "So Good" (snippet) – 1:03
 "Now That She's Gone" (snippet) – 1:11

US maxi-CD and 12-inch single, Australian CD single
 "Bills, Bills, Bills" (album version) – 4:16
 "Bills, Bills, Bills" (Digital Black-N-Groove club mix) – 7:16
 "Bills, Bills, Bills" (a cappella) – 4:00
 "Bills, Bills, Bills" (Maurice's Xclusive Livegig mix) – 7:33
 "Bills, Bills, Bills" (Maurice's Xclusive dub mix) – 8:04

UK CD1
 "Bills, Bills, Bills" – 4:16
 "Bills, Bills, Bills" (I Can't Go for That remix) – 3:57
 "No, No, No" (Part II—featuring Wyclef Jean) – 3:30

UK CD2
 "Bills, Bills, Bills" – 4:16
 "Bills, Bills, Bills" (Maurice's Xclusive Livegig mix) – 7:33
 "With Me Part II" (featuring Master P) – 4:14

UK cassette single
 "Bills, Bills, Bills" – 4:16
 "Bills, Bills, Bills" (I Can't Go for That remix) – 3:57

European CD1
 "Bills, Bills, Bills" – 4:16
 "I Can't Go for That" ("Bills, Bills, Bills" remix radio edit) – 3:39

European CD2
 "Bills, Bills, Bills" – 4:16
 "I Can't Go for That" ("Bills, Bills, Bills" remix radio edit) – 3:38
 "I Can't Go for That" ("Bills, Bills, Bills" remix) – 3:57
 "No, No, No" (Part I) – 4:07
 "With Me Part II" (featuring Master P) – 4:14

Credits and personnel
Credits are taken from the US CD single liner notes and The Writing's on the Wall album booklet.

Studios
 Recorded at Digital Services (Houston, Texas) and DARP Studios (Atlanta, Georgia)
 Mixed at Larrabee North Studios (Universal City, California)

Personnel

 Kevin "She'kspere" Briggs – writing (as Kevin Briggs), all instruments, midi and sound, production, vocal production, recording
 Kandi – writing
 Beyoncé Knowles – writing, vocal production
 LeToya Luckett – writing
 Kelly Rowland – writing

 Michael Calderon – recording
 Vernon Mungo – recording
 Claudine Pontier – recording assistant
 Kevin "KD" Davis – mixing
 Steve Baughman – mixing assistant

Charts

Weekly charts

Year-end charts

Certifications

Release history

Cover versions
Sporty Thievz, the same group that wrote "No Pigeons" as an answer song to TLC's "No Scrubs", wrote a response to "Bills, Bills, Bills" entitled "No Billz (Why, Why, Why)." Sporty Thievz were also featured on "I Can't Go For That", a re-recorded remix of "Bills, Bills, Bills" with new lyrics, produced by the Trackmasters, along with a rapper called Jazz.  

In 2015, New York-based rock band They Might Be Giants recorded a cover version, later released on their album Phone Power.

The song was also performed a cappella by the fictional Dalton Academy Warblers group on the American musical television series Glee in the eleventh episode of the second season, entitled The Sue Sylvester Shuffle.

See also
 List of number-one R&B singles of 1999 (U.S.)
 List of Billboard Hot 100 number-one singles of 1999

References

External links
 

1999 singles
1999 songs
Billboard Hot 100 number-one singles
Destiny's Child songs
Music videos directed by Darren Grant
Songs with feminist themes
Songs written by Beyoncé
Songs written by LeToya Luckett
Songs written by Kelly Rowland
Songs written by Kandi Burruss
Songs written by Kevin "She'kspere" Briggs
Songs written by LaTavia Roberson
They Might Be Giants songs